Alexander Borisovich Godunov (November 28, 1949 – May 18, 1995)  was a Russian-American ballet dancer and film actor. A member of the Bolshoi Ballet, he became the troupe's Premier danseur. In 1979, he defected to the United States. While continuing to dance, he also began working as a supporting actor in Hollywood films.  He had several small but prominent roles in films such as Witness and Die Hard.

Early life and dance career
Godunov was born in Yuzhno-Sakhalinsk (Sakhalin, Russian SFSR, USSR) in the Russian Far East. He began his ballet studies at the age of nine in Riga in 1958 in the same class as Mikhail Baryshnikov. He said his mother put him in ballet to prevent him from becoming "a hooligan". He and Baryshnikov became friends and helped each other throughout their years there.

Godunov joined the Bolshoi Ballet in 1971 and rose to become Premier danseur. His teachers there included Aleksey Yermolayev.

In 1973, Godunov won a gold medal at the Moscow International Ballet Competition. After playing Vronsky in 1976's Anna Karenina and Lemisson, the Royal minstrel, in the 1978 film version of J. B. Priestley's 31 June, he became well-known in the Soviet Union as a movie actor, receiving the title of Honored Artist of the RSFSR in 1976.

Defection from the USSR
On August 21, 1979, while on a tour with the Bolshoi Ballet in New York City, Godunov contacted authorities and asked for political asylum. After discovering his absence, the KGB responded by putting his wife, Lyudmila Vlasova, a soloist with the company, on a plane to Moscow, but the flight was stopped before takeoff. After three days, with involvement by President Jimmy Carter and Soviet leader Leonid Brezhnev, the U.S. State Department was satisfied that Vlasova had chosen to return to the Soviet Union of her own free will and allowed the plane to depart. The incident was dramatized in a 1986 movie, Flight 222. Vlasova later said that while Godunov loved American culture and had long desired to live in the United States, she felt she was "too Russian" to live in the United States. The couple divorced in 1982.

Later career
Godunov joined the American Ballet Theatre and danced as a principal dancer until 1982, when he had a falling-out with Mikhail Baryshnikov, the director of the company. A press release for the American Ballet Theatre stated a change in the troupe's repertoire did not provide Godunov with sufficient roles. Following his release, he traveled with his own troupe and danced as a guest artist around the world with a number of prominent ballet troupes.

Godunov also began working in Hollywood as a film actor. His acting roles included an Amish farmer in Witness (1985), a comically narcissistic symphony conductor in The Money Pit (1986) and one of the thieves in Die Hard (1988). He declined roles which typecast him as a dancer or as an action villain, as in Die Hard.

Personal life
Godunov married Lyudmila Vlasova, a soloist with the Bolshoi Ballet, in 1971. The couple had no children and divorced in 1982 after a long separation.

In 1981, Godunov began dating actress Jacqueline Bisset after meeting her at a party in New York City. They broke up in 1988.

According to author Herbie J Pilato, Godunov had an affair with actress Elizabeth Montgomery while she was in a relationship with (but not yet married to) Robert Foxworth. By sheer coincidence, Godunov was found dead on the same day as Montgomery's death, although it was believed he had been deceased for several days prior.

Godunov became a naturalized citizen of the United States in 1987.

Death
Godunov drank alcohol to excess and this became a problem as he got older. On May 18, 1995, Godunov's friends became concerned when he had been uncharacteristically quiet with his phone calls. A nurse, who had not heard from him since May 8, went to his home in the Shoreham Towers, West Hollywood, California, where his body was discovered. Godunov's death was determined to be due to complications from hepatitis secondary to chronic alcoholism.

Godunov was cremated and his ashes scattered into the Pacific Ocean. A memorial to him at Gates Mortuary in Los Angeles is engraved with the epitaph "His future remained in the past."

Filmography

See also

 List of dancers
 List of Russian ballet dancers
 List of Eastern Bloc defectors

References

External links

 

1949 births
1995 deaths
20th-century American male actors
20th-century Russian male actors
Alcohol-related deaths in California
American male ballet dancers
American male film actors
Deaths from hepatitis
Honored Artists of the RSFSR
Naturalized citizens of the United States
People from Yuzhno-Sakhalinsk
Russian male ballet dancers
Soviet emigrants to the United States
Soviet defectors
20th-century American ballet dancers